FUCT may refer to:
 Glycoprotein 6-alpha-L-fucosyltransferase, an enzyme
 FUCT (clothing)
 From Under the Cork Tree, an album by Fall Out Boy